Rayanallur village is situated on the banks of the veeranam lake in North Chidambaram town, Cuddalore District in the state of Tamil Nadu.

Demographics 

The village primary is agrarian based economy with most of the workforce engaged in tilling of ancestral land. The primary crop is Paddy and green gram done in seasonal rotation. The village is also known for her betel leaf production.

According to 2011 census, the population of the Rayanallur village is about 3600. with Male 1,721 Females 1879. A total of 451 were under the age of six, constituting 233 males and 218 females.
 
The average literacy of the Village was 67.66%, The village has a total of 784 households. There were a total of 1443 workers, which comprising cultivators, main agricultural laborers, household industries, marginal workers, marginal cultivators, marginal agricultural laborers, marginal workers in household industries other marginal workers. And other workers.

Main streets in Rayanallur 
 Kilakku Theru (East Street)
 Vadukku Theru (North Street)
 Therkku Theru (South Street)
 MGR Street
 Yathaver Street

Temples in Village 
 Lord Shri Shiva Temple  
 Lord Shri Ganesh Temple  
 Sri Throwpathi Amman Temple  
 Sri Aiyanar Temple''' Schools in Rayanallur Government-Aided Primary School'''

References

 http://www.censusindia.gov.in/pca/SearchDetails.aspx?Id=691803

See also

 Lalpet
 Kattumannarkoil
 Kattumannarkoil#Veeranam Lake and water resources
 Cuddalore
 Chidambaram
 Sethiyathope

Villages in Cuddalore district